The Herengracht is the second of four Amsterdam canals belonging to the canal belt and lies between the Singel and the Keizersgracht. 
The Gouden Bocht (Golden Bend) in particular is known for its large and beautiful canal houses.

History

The Herengracht was built starting in 1612 on the initiative of Mayor Frans Hendricksz. Oetgens, city carpenter Hendrick Jacobsz. Staets and city surveyor Lucas Jansz Sinck.
Before that it was a moat (dug in 1585) for the companies located behind the Singel. 
The canal ran within the city wall parallel to the canal outside the city wall. 
The Herengracht therefore still has a kink at Driekoningenstraat, where the outer moat was routed around a stronghold at that height. 
When the ditch was widened into the present canal it was given the name Herengracht in 1612, after the Heren Regeerders van de stad Amsterdam (Gentlemen Governors of the city of Amsterdam).

The part between Leidsegracht and the Binnen Amstel is part of the expansion after 1658. 
This part contains the Gouden Bocht (Golden Bend), the most prestigious part of the Herengracht. 
Many of the houses were inhabited here by regents, mayors and traders who earned their fortunes in trade with South America or the Dutch East Indies.

Many buildings were built by the Amsterdam architects Philips Vingboons (1607–78) or Adriaan Dortsman (1635–82).

In the last expansion, the section east of the Amstel was laid to the water of the IJ. 
This last part, located in the prosperous part of Amsterdam's Jewish quarter, was named Nieuwe Herengracht.

Monuments 
There are many monumental canal houses on Herengracht, such as:

 59: De Hond, (The Dog), from 1659.
 120: De Coningh van Denemarken (The King of Denmark), from 1615.
 170-172: Bartolotti House, or "Het Bonte Huis", from around 1617.
 203: Koopmanshuis, from ± 1618.
 274: D 'Witte Leli, from 1739.
 284: Van Brienen House, from 1728.
 361: Sonnenberg, from ± 1655.
 364-370: Cromhouthuizen, from 1660 to 1662
 394: Vier Heemskinderen, from ± 1671. Named for the legend of The Four Sons of Aymon.
 432: The former home of pastor Ferdinand Domela Nieuwenhuis.
 446: Huis van de Graeff, former city palace of Andries de Graeff
 450: Huis van Deutz, from 1663, house of Andries Adolf Deutz van Assendelft after 1722.
 462: Sweedenrijk (Sweden), from 1672.
 476: Huis De Vicq, from 1670.
 475: Huis De Neufville (Huis aan de Bocht), from 1731 and 1733.
 478: House of John Sillem (1837-1896), Dutch banker
 502: Huis met de Kolommen (House with the Columns), from 1672; official residence of the mayor.
 528-530: Two houses under one roof from 1686, commissioned by the brothers Louis of Lodewijk Trip (1605-1684) and Hendrick Trip (1607-1666), the same clients of the Trippenhuis on Kloveniersburgwal 29 in Amsterdam. Vestibule 528 rebuilt by architect Eduard Cuypers in 1895.
 572: Heren aan de Gracht, with 18th-century period rooms.
 573 : former residence of Cornelis de Graeff.

There are also historic gardens such as:

412: The garden and garden house of G. Belin la Garde.
168: Historical garden.

Museums

Museums 
 Bartolotti Museum House, Herengracht 170
 The Canal House at Herengracht 386.
 The Bijbels Museum at Herengracht 366-368 (in the Cromhouthuizen).
 The KattenKabinet at Herengracht 497.
 The Museum Geelvinck-Hinlopen at Herengracht 518 (entrance: Keizersgracht 633).
 The Museum of Bags and Purses (Tassenmuseum Hendrikje) at Herengracht 573.
 The Museum Willet-Holthuysen at Herengracht 605 with a formal garden adjacent to the Amstelstraat.
 The activities of the Toneelmuseum (formerly in 'Huis Bartolotti') have been taken over by the Theater Instituut Nederland (TIN) at Sarphatistraat 53.

Orientation 

Herengracht begins in the north at the  Brouwersgracht in the West Indian house bridge and Milkmaid Bridge, parallels bends on the Singel and the Keizersgracht gradually towards the southeast, and flows into the Amstel. 
The odd-numbered side of the canal is on the side of the heart of the city (Dam Square).

 The intersection with Raadhuisstraat is at Herengracht 184 and 211
 The junction with Leidsestraat / Koningsplein is located at Herengracht 424 and 433.
 The junction with Vijzelstraat is located at Herengracht 482 and 513.
 The Thorbeckeplein is located at Herengracht 561 and 563 at the Reguliersgracht.
 The intersection with Utrechtsestraat is at Herengracht 556 and 587.
 The canal flows into the Amstel at Herengracht 598 and 627.

Bridges 
The Herengracht is spanned by eleven bridges:

With the passage heights in the table, one should take into account the fact that the Herengracht, like all other canals in the city center, is - from the Amsterdam Ordnance Datum.

Herengracht canals elsewhere 

The Herengracht in The Hague is filled in. Maarssen also has a Herengracht; on the right bank of the Vecht. There are also Herengrachts in Drimmelen, Leiden, Muiden, Middelburg, Purmerend, Terneuzen, Weesp and even in Cape Town and other places in South Africa. In Madurodam a part of the Amsterdam Herengracht can be seen in miniature.

See also 
Canals of Amsterdam

Notes

Canals in Amsterdam